Drude is a surname. Notable people with the surname include:

 Antoine Drude (1853–1943), French general
 Carl Georg Oscar Drude (1852–1933), German botanist
 Paul Drude (1863–1906), German physicist

See also
 Draude
 Drude, type of witch
 Drood
 Drue